Melissa Gonzalez (born 24 June 1994) is a Colombian-American athlete specializing in the 400 metres hurdles. Born in El Paso, Texas, she holds dual citizenship due to her father's Colombian origin, and she elected to represent Colombia in international competition. She won a gold medal at the South American Championships in 2019 where she also broke the 25 year old national record in the event. Gonzalez won a silver medal at the 2018 South American Games and two medals at the 2017 South American Championships. Her personal best is 55.32 seconds set in the 2020 Summer Olympics.

Gonzalez is married to American football player David Blough. Her younger brother, Christian, also plays the sport.

International competitions

Personal life
Gonzalez is a Christian. She married American football quarterback David Blough in March 2019.

Her father Hector is 6-foot-9 and played college basketball at the University of Texas at El Paso before playing semiprofessionally in Colombia. She has two sisters, Samatha and Lily, and a brother, Christian. Samatha also represents Colombia in international events and was a college All-American in the 4 × 400 metres relay at the University of Miami, while Christian played college football for the Colorado Buffaloes and Oregon Ducks.

References

External links

1994 births
Living people
Colombian female hurdlers
Athletes (track and field) at the 2018 South American Games
South American Games gold medalists for Colombia
South American Games silver medalists for Colombia
South American Games medalists in athletics
Central American and Caribbean Games bronze medalists for Colombia
Competitors at the 2018 Central American and Caribbean Games
Athletes (track and field) at the 2019 Pan American Games
Pan American Games competitors for Colombia
South American Championships in Athletics winners
Central American and Caribbean Games medalists in athletics
Texas Longhorns women's track and field athletes
South American Games gold medalists in athletics
Athletes (track and field) at the 2020 Summer Olympics
Olympic athletes of Colombia
Track and field athletes from Texas